Myxoderma may refer to:
 Myxoderma (sea star), a genus of sea stars in the family Zoroasteridae
 Myxoderma, a genus of fungi in the family Amanitaceae; synonym of Limacella
 Myxoderma, a genus of bacteria; synonym of Nostochopsis